Space Ritual are a British space rock band, formed in 2000 fronted by Nik Turner, and composed principally of former Hawkwind members. They play a mix of early Hawkwind material and their own compositions.

History
The Hawkestra event took place on 21 October 2000 at the Brixton Academy which featured nearly all past members of Hawkwind, but disagreements between various participants led to any restaging of the event being unlikely. Chris Hewitt who had worked with Nik Turner back at Deeply Vale in the late 1970s put on two gigs in 2001 with Nik's chosen name "The Isle of Wight line up of Hawkwind". These two gigs were at Stairways in Birkenhead and The Empress Ballroom in Blackpool. Chris Hewitt then started to manage the band and put together The Greasy Truckers Party 2001 at The Astoria in London, featuring members of the Hawkestra on 21 October 2001 at the London Astoria, which, despite being invited, all of the then members of Hawkwind refused to be a part of.

Turner's band continued performing further gigs and eventually went by the name of xhawkwind.com. An appearance at Guilfest in 2002 led to confusion as to whether this actually was Hawkwind, sufficiently irking Dave Brock into taking legal action to prohibit Turner from trading under the name XHawkwind, a case which Turner lost.

Turner then chose to name the band Space Ritual.net, after Hawkwind's 1973 live album The Space Ritual Alive,  having previously used the name Space Ritual during the mid-1990s for a North America tour. The gigs in 2002 and 2003 were named Greasy Truckers Parties and featured SpaceRitual.net with many ex members of Hawkwind plus dancers, Striking Lighting's superb lightshow and many other artists, Inner City Unit, The Theory, Richard Kid Strange, Tractor, Guitar George Borowski giving the feel of a touring circus-type event.

Members

Principal members
Nik Turner – vocals, sax, flute (Hawkwind 1969–77, 1982–84)
Mick Slattery – lead guitar, vocals (Hawkwind 1969–70)
Thomas Crimble – keyboards, previously bass and rhythm guitar (Hawkwind 1970–71)
Terry Ollis – drums, percussion (Hawkwind 1969–72)
Chris Purdon (a.k.a. Chris Mekon) – synthesizers, FX
Gary 'Slapper' Smart – bass guitar
Miss Angel – Dancer

Affiliates
Del Dettmar – electronics (Hawkwind 1971–74)
Ron Tree – vocals (Hawkwind 1995–2001)
Meurig Griffiths – drums

Former members and affiliates
Dave Anderson – analogue synthesiser, bass (Hawkwind 1971)
Jerry Richards – bass guitar (Hawkwind guitarist 1995–2001)
Commander Jim Hawkman – keyboards
John Greves – keyboards & synthesisers (1999–2006)
Thomas Hewitt – guitar
Jaki Windmill – Djembe, Vocals
Debespace
Lloyd George – aka Doktor Hotknife or 'the new Dik Mik' – Synths & Keyboards
Sam Ollis – drums, DJ record decks

Discography

Studio releases

Live recordings

Video releases

References

External links
www.spaceritual.net – Official site
www.myspace.com/spaceritualofficial – MySpace site
 
Ham Life blog – A fan's reviews and photos

Hawkwind
English space rock musical groups
2000 establishments in England
Musical groups established in 2000